MacKenzie Evan Gore (born February 24, 1999) is an American professional baseball pitcher for the Washington Nationals of Major League Baseball (MLB). He made his MLB debut in 2022 with the San Diego Padres.

Amateur career
Gore attended Whiteville High School in Whiteville, North Carolina. As a junior, he was 12–1 with a 0.08 earned run average (ERA) and 174 strikeouts in  innings pitched. During the season, he threw a no-hitter with 18 strikeouts. He led Whiteville to the 1-A state championship four years in a row, winning three, with Gore being named MVP of all three victories. During the summer 2016, he played in the Perfect Game Classic at Petco Park. Gore committed to the East Carolina University to play college baseball.

Professional career

Minor leagues
Gore was considered one of the top prospects for the 2017 Major League Baseball draft. He was drafted by the San Diego Padres with the third overall pick. He signed a rookie contract on June 23, 2017. He spent 2017 with the Arizona League Padres where he pitched in seven games, posting a 0–1 record, a 1.27 ERA, and a 0.98 WHIP in seven starts. He spent 2018 with the Fort Wayne TinCaps, going 2–5 with a 4.45 ERA over 16 starts.

Gore began 2019 with the Lake Elsinore Storm, earning California League All-Star honors. That June, he was named to the 2019 All-Star Futures Game. After pitching to a 7–1 record and a 1.02 ERA over 15 starts, striking out 110 batters over  innings, he was promoted to the Amarillo Sod Poodles in early July. He produced a 2–1 record with a 4.15 ERA over  innings for Amarillo.

At the start of 2020, MLB Pipeline rated Gore as the best pitching prospect in minor league baseball and the fifth best prospect overall. He did not play a game in 2020 due to the cancellation of the season caused by the COVID-19 pandemic. Gore began the 2021 season with the El Paso Chihuahuas, but was placed on the injured list after compiling a 5.85 ERA over six starts to go along with a lingering blister and various mechanical issues. Gore made three rehab appearances before he was assigned to the San Antonio Missions with whom he threw eight innings in which he walked nine, struck out 16, and gave up three earned runs. He ended the season being ranked the 56th overall best prospect in baseball and the fourth best left handed pitching prospect. He was assigned to the Peoria Javelinas of the Arizona Fall League after the season. On November 19, 2021, the Padres added Gore to their 40-man roster to protect him from the Rule 5 draft.

San Diego Padres
Gore was not part of the Padres Opening Day roster in 2022, starting the season instead with El Paso after the Padres traded for Sean Manaea the weekend before the season started. But Gore was quickly called up when Blake Snell was placed on the IL after his first start.  Gore made his MLB debut on April 15, 2022, pitching against the defending champion Atlanta Braves. He threw  innings while giving up 3 hits and 2 runs. He recorded his first career strikeout against Braves second baseman Ozzie Albies with a  fastball. He earned his first win on April 20.  Gore stayed up with the Padres even after Snell and Mike Clevinger rejoined the club, operating out of what was at first a temporary six-man rotation that became regular usage by the end of May. The Padres placed Gore on the 15-day injured list on July 26, due to left elbow inflammation.

Washington Nationals
On August 2, 2022, Gore, along with C. J. Abrams, Luke Voit, Robert Hassell, James Wood, and Jarlín Susana were traded to the Washington Nationals in exchange for Juan Soto and Josh Bell. Gore made rehabilitation starts for the Rochester Red Wings, but did not pitch for the Nationals in 2022.

References

External links

1999 births
Living people
Baseball players from North Carolina
People from Whiteville, North Carolina
Major League Baseball pitchers
San Diego Padres players
Arizona League Padres players
Fort Wayne TinCaps players
Lake Elsinore Storm players
Amarillo Sod Poodles players
El Paso Chihuahuas players
San Antonio Missions players
Arizona Complex League Padres players
Peoria Javelinas players
Rochester Red Wings players